The 2010 Kazakhstan First Division was the 16th edition of Kazakhstan First Division, the second level football competition in Kazakhstan. 18 teams played against each other on a home-away system. The top two teams gained promotion to the Premier League next season. The league started on May 1 and finished on October 24.

Promoted teams were FC Vostok and FC Kaisar.

Teams

Stadia and locations

League table

External links
soccerway.com; Final standings

Kazakhstan First Division seasons
2
Kazakhstan
Kazakhstan